Stanley Stevenson Byrne (born 25 January 1993), better known by his stage name Fox Stevenson (formerly Stan SB / Stan SSB), is an English singer-songwriter, DJ and producer of bass music, mostly drum and bass and glitch hop. He has released eleven EPs under Fox Stevenson, one under Stan SB, and has been featured on two compilations under Stan SB and eighteen under the name of Fox Stevenson.

Music career
Stevenson's interest in electronic music production began in the early 2000s, when he made his first release on the website Newgrounds. He was 1516 years old when he created his first vocal track. He later rose to prominence through the YouTube-based music community and nowadays an influential drum and bass label Liquicity, where "Cloudhead", one of his earliest tracks as Stan SB, was featured.

His works are also published to the audio distribution platform SoundCloud since 2012, under the alias Stan SB and from 2013 under the alias Fox Stevenson. In 2013, he released an EP titled Endless, the title track of which has since gained over 1.6 million listens on SoundCloud.

In 2014, he announced the launch of his own record label, Cloudhead Records, under which he released an EP titled All This Time in the same year. In July 2014, Stevenson released Throwdown, an EP accompanied by a live online premiere.

In August 2015, he released a collaboration on Spinnin' Records with UK EDM artist Curbi, titled Hoohah. He signed with the dubstep label Disciple in March 2016 and in April 2016 released his first EP on the label, No Fox Given. On 12 September 2016, Fox Stevenson released a single titled "Rocket" on Disciple for the Alliance, Vol. 3 EP.

His debut album, Killjoy, was released on 18 October 2019.

Genres
Stevenson is particularly known for creating drum and bass, liquid drum & bass, glitch hop, house and dubstep tracks. However, he is keen to experiment with many musical genres, stating that "there are tonnes of intricacies to each and every genre."

Discography

As Stan SB

Extended plays

Singles

Remixes

Notable compilation appearances

As Fox Stevenson

Albums

Extended plays

Singles

Remixes

Notable compilation appearances

Music videos

References

External links
Beatport page

English drum and bass musicians
English male singer-songwriters
English record producers 
DJs from Leeds
Dubstep musicians
Electro house musicians
Future house musicians
Monstercat artists
Electronic dance music DJs